Natsume Championship Wrestling is a 1994 Super Nintendo Entertainment System video game that was released in North America.

Players must become either the Triple Crown Champion or the Triple Crown Tag Team Champions and achieve the limits of professional wrestling.

Natsume Championship Wrestling was added to the Nintendo Switch Online subscription service in July 2020.

Summary
This game is an unlicensed wrestling game, lacking a license from a professional wrestling promotion like World Championship Wrestling or the World Wrestling Federation. The Japanese version, however, included a license from All Japan Pro Wrestling.

The player has a choice between an exhibition, a round-robin tournament, and a championship tournament. Players must choose between 12 wrestlers who have ten minutes to knock each other out. Each wrestlers has a very extensive set of moves depending on their situation in the ring. Every victory screen with have both wrestlers' taunts, the time of the match, and the condition that caused the victory. The championship tournament has three difficulty levels: easy, medium, and hard. Criticism for this game was mixed from very positive to very negative.

There are more than fifty moves to master and an intelligent AI offers up plenty of might for the player. Six levels of energy bars (in order from best to worst: blue, green, yellow, orange, red, black) and the ability to heal help to separate this game from the other wrestling games of that era. However, recovery time is increased when the player is severely hurt.

References

1994 video games
Natsume (company) games
Professional wrestling games
Super Nintendo Entertainment System games
Video games scored by Iku Mizutani
Video games scored by Hiroyuki Iwatsuki
Video games scored by Kinuyo Yamashita
Video games developed in Japan
Virtual Console games
Virtual Console games for Wii U
Multiplayer and single-player video games
Nintendo Switch Online games